Overwatch is a digital comic series published online by Blizzard Entertainment and republished by Dark Horse Comics, featuring events surrounding the characters of the Overwatch universe. It was published between April 2016 and April 2018.

Blizzard uses the comic series, along with animated media, fictional news reports, and online character biographies, to develop the narrative of Overwatch, as the video game includes no traditional story or campaign mode.

Development
Blizzard did not include a traditional campaign or story mode in the Overwatch video game. Instead, Blizzard opted to develop the story and lore of the Overwatch universe through a transmedia storytelling method, including animated shorts and comic titles.

On the approach to the storytelling, senior game designer Michael Chu, stated, "it was a solution that was born out of the kind of game we were making, because multiplayer shooter, obviously usually doesn't have a linear story. We had to think about other things, and we knew from day one that we wanted to make a significant Overwatch universe." Chu has also elaborated on how Blizzard decides which stories to tell through a comic format, stating, "every time we approach a story, very much like the skins, we have this backlog of story ideas, and hooks that we'd like to explore. We decide which ones we feel are the most exciting or make sense for the present. Like if we do a comic, comics are better for telling certain types of stories," adding, "we really decide what kind of story we want to tell, what's the story that we're going to tell, and then it's all about, lets figure out the best way to do this."

Publication history
Blizzard announced they would release six digital comics prior to the game's May 24, 2016 release, in addition to a graphic novel titled Overwatch: First Strike, set for a release later in 2016. First Strike was later revealed to have a November 2016 digital release, in addition to an April 2017 hardcover release. On April 21, 2016, Train Hopper, headlining the cowboy character McCree, became the first Overwatch comic title released by Blizzard. This issue, as well as all subsequent issues of the comic title, were published for free.

The comic series is published in cooperation with Dark Horse Comics, who republish the series on their own digital comic service. Animated versions, or animatics, of the comic's issues are also produced and released by Madefire Studios, an interactive comics publishing platform, shortly after they are released on Blizzard's own service. Madefire's animated versions are viewable on Battle.net, as well.

Although Blizzard initially announced six comic issues to be released, they published Legacy, featuring Ana in July 2016. Ana was also the first character to be added into the game post-release. Later in the month, Blizzard and Dark Horse announced a deal that would have Dark Horse publish future comic works centered around the Overwatch universe, as well as the First Strike graphic novel and an art book. Blizzard later released holiday themed issues, Junkenstein and Reflections, in October and December 2016, respectively. In Reflections, the character Tracer is portrayed in a lesbian relationship, making her the first Overwatch character to be confirmed canonically LGBT. As a result, access to this issue was made unavailable in Russia, to avoid legal conflict with the country's ban against gay propaganda.

On November 18, 2016, Blizzard announced it had canceled the release of the First Strike graphic novel. In the cancellation announcement, Michael Chu detailed that "the original idea for the graphic novel dates back to the early days of the game's development and came from our desire to tell the story of the founding of Overwatch during the Omnic Crisis." Chu added that, "in the years since First Strike conception, we have done a lot of development on the universe and its stories. While the core of this story remains, we have changed and expanded upon how we see the events that took place during the first days of Overwatch." Micky Neilson and Ludo Lullabi were slated to be the writer and artist for the graphic novel, respectively.

A hardcover collection of the first twelve issues of the Overwatch digital comics titled Overwatch: Anthology, Volume 1 was released on October 10, 2017. Dark Horse published an expanded edition of the anthology in November 2021, with a hardcover version released on December 1. The Russian edition of Anthology, Volume 1 originally did not include the Reflections issue to meet the original game's 12+ age restriction, although the issue was included in the 18+ rated 2021 re-issue of the anthology.

In April 2018, Blizzard released Retribution, the 16th issue of the comic series to tie-in with the game's Archive: Retribution event. No further issues of the series were released after this; however, in September 2020, Blizzard began releasing Tracer—London Calling, a five-issue mini-series.

Issues

Notes

References

External links
Overwatch comics

2010s webcomics
2016 webcomic debuts
American comics
Comics set in Australia
Comics set in Brazil
Comics set in Egypt
Comics set in Italy
Comics set in Monaco
Comics set in Sweden
Comics set in the United Kingdom
Comics set in the United States
Dark Horse Comics titles
Overwatch
Science fiction webcomics
Transmedia storytelling
2018 webcomic endings
Works banned in Russia